Ottery may refer to:

Ottery, Cape Town
Ottery Hundred, Devon, England
Ottery St Mary
Ottery St Mary A.F.C.
Ottery St Mary astronomical clock
Ottery St Mary railway station
The King's School, Ottery St Mary
River Ottery, Cornwall, England
Upottery, Devon, England

See also
 Otter (disambiguation)
 Oteri, surname